JWCC may refer to:
 ISU Junior World Challenge Cup, international synchronized skating competition
 Japan Women's Curling Championship, annual curling championship hosted in Japan
 John Wood Community College, college in Quincy, Illinois
 Joint Warfighter Cloud Capability, a U.S. Department of Defense cloud computing procurement contract  (JWCC)
 Jurassic World Camp Cretaceous, an American animated TV series